Kenneth Kedi (born 1971) is a Marshallese politician. He has been Speaker of the Legislature of the Marshall Islands since 4 January 2016 and was re-elected in 2020. Kedi is a member of the Kien Eo Ad (KEA) party.

Life
Kedi was born in 1971. Kedi is a member of the Kien Eo Ad (KEA) party. He represents the Rongelap Atoll in the Legislature. He has stated that people from the atoll are hesitant to return after nuclear testing on the island by the United States during the 20th-century.

In June 2011 when Kedi was Minister of Transport and Communications, he was charged with ten counts of criminal acts relating to misappropriation of funds, making it the first time a Marshall Islands minister was charged with criminal acts. When the case went to court the next month seven of the charges were dropped, and Kedi pleaded no contest to the remaining three. The amount of money involved in the case was around US$2000. Kedi received a suspended prison sentence of 30 days, and a $1000 fine. He continued to serve as Minister.

On 4 January 2016 Kedi was elected Speaker of the Legislature of the Marshall Islands. He won the election with 19 to 14 votes of former Marshall Islands President Christopher Loeak. He succeeded Donald Capelle. In November 2018 he supported an ultimately unsuccessful vote of no-confidence in President Hilda Heine. In October 2019 the Supreme Court of the Marshall Islands struck down the country's voting law as unconstitutional relating to an issue for offshore postal ballots. Kedi subsequently argued that previous election law which did allow for offshore postal ballots to take effect again.

On 6 January 2020 Kedi was re-elected as Speaker, defeating Brenson Wase with 19 against 14 votes.

In February 2023, The Washington Post reported that Kedi is under investigation by the Marshall Islands' attorney general.

References

1971 births
Living people
Government ministers of the Marshall Islands
Members of the Legislature of the Marshall Islands
Speakers of the Legislature of the Marshall Islands
People from the Ralik Chain